USS Sandusky (PF-54), a  in commission from 1944 to 1945, was the second United States Navy ship of the name and the first to be named for Sandusky, Ohio. She later served in the Soviet Navy as EK-7 and in the Japan Maritime Self-Defense Force as JDS Nire (PF-7), Nire (PF-287) and as YAC-19.

Construction and commissioning
Sandusky, originally classified as a "patrol gunboat," PG-162, was reclassified as a "patrol frigate," PF-54 on 15 April 1943. Laid down on 8 July 1943, under a Maritime Commission contract by Froemming Brothers, Inc., in Milwaukee, Wisconsin, she was launched on 5 October 1943, sponsored by Miss Mabel Apel, and commissioned on 18 April 1944 at New Orleans, Louisiana, with Lieutenant Commander Thomas R. Sargent III, USCG, in command.

Service history

U.S. Navy, World War II, 1944–1945
After shakedown at Bermuda and overhaul at Philadelphia, Pennsylvania, Sandusky departed for the Pacific Ocean on 18 August 1944, escorting a convoy from New York City to Finschhafen and Hollandia, New Guinea.  After completing the long convoy voyage on 2 October 1944, she proceeded to Morotai, conducting anti-submarine patrols there for the rest of the month.  From November 1944 through February 1945, she escorted convoys between Hollandia and Leyte in the Philippine Islands in support of U.S.  troops occupying the Philippines. After escorting a convoy to Lingayen Gulf at Luzon in the Philippines, she departed from Leyte on 8 March 1945 for Seattle, Washington.

Following overhaul, Machias proceeded to Kodiak in the Territory of Alaska. Training of Sanduksys new Soviet Navy crew soon began at Cold Bay.

Soviet Navy, 1945–1949

Sandusky was decommissioned on 12 July 1945 at Cold Bay and transferred to the Soviet Union under Lend-Lease immediately along with nine of her sister ships, the first group of patrol frigates transferred to the Soviet Navy. Commissioned into the Soviet Navy immediately, Sandusky was designated as a storozhevoi korabl ("escort ship") and renamed EK-7 in Soviet service. On 15 July 1945, EK-7 departed Cold Bay in company with nine of her sister ships – EK-1 (ex-Charlottesville), EK-2 (ex-Long Beach), EK-3 (ex-Belfast), EK-4 (ex-Machias), EK-5 (ex-San Pedro), EK-6 (ex-Glendale), EK-8 (ex-Coronado), EK-9 (ex-Allentown), and EK-10 (ex-) – bound for Petropavlovsk-Kamchatsky in the Soviet Union. EK-7 served as a patrol vessel in the Soviet Far East.

In February 1946, the United States began negotiations for the return of ships loaned to the Soviet Union for use during World War II. On 8 May 1947, United States Secretary of the Navy James V. Forrestal informed the United States Department of State that the United States Department of the Navy wanted 480 of the 585 combatant ships it had transferred to the Soviet Union for World War II use returned, EK-7 among them. Negotiations for the return of the ships were protracted, but on 15 October 1949 the Soviet Union finally returned EK-7 to the U.S. Navy at Yokosuka, Japan.

Japan Maritime Self-Defense Force, 1953–1970

Nire was redesignated PF-287 on 1 September 1957. The United States struck her from the Navy list on 1 December 1961 and transferred her outright to Japan on 28 August 1962. In 1969, she was reclassified as an "auxiliary stock craft" (YAC) and renamed YAC-19. Japan returned her to the United States on 31 March 1970 for disposal.

Awards
The U.S. Navy awarded Sandusky two battle stars for her World War II service.

References

External links 
 
 hazegray.org: USS Sandusky
 

 

Tacoma-class frigates
Ships built in Milwaukee
1943 ships
World War II frigates and destroyer escorts of the United States
Tacoma-class frigates of the Soviet Navy
World War II frigates of the Soviet Union
Cold War frigates of the Soviet Union
Tacoma-class frigates of the Japan Maritime Self-Defense Force
Ships transferred under Project Hula